Košarkaški klub Borovica, commonly referred to as KK Borovica Ruma, was a men's professional basketball club based in Ruma, Serbia, FR Yugoslavia.

History
The most successful years were from 1994 to 1998, under the name KK Borovica. Borovica finished the 1994–95 YUBA League season as a runner-up, lost the Play-off Finals from Partizan. The club also played the FIBA Korać Cup in the 1995–96 season.

Coaches

  Zvezdan Mitrović (1993–1994)
  Zlatan Tomić (1994)
  Željko Lukajić (1994–1995)
  Janko Lukovski (1995–1996)
  Nikola Lazić (1997–1998)
  Zlatan Tomić (1998)

Notable players

  Zoran Sretenović (1994–1995, 1996–1997)
  Mileta Lisica (1994–1995)
  Vladimir Dragutinović (1994–1996)
  Zoran Milović (1996–1998)
  Slobodan Agoč (1997–1998)

International record

References

External links 
Profile at eurobasket.com

Defunct basketball teams in Serbia
Basketball teams in Yugoslavia
Basketball teams disestablished in 1999
1999 disestablishments in Serbia
Ruma